Me Against the World is the seventh installment in The Emo Diaries series of compilation albums, released March 5, 2002 by Deep Elm Records. As with all installments in the series, the label had an open submissions policy for bands to submit material for the compilation, and as a result the music does not all fit within the emo style. As with the rest of the series, Me Against the World features mostly unsigned bands contributing songs that were previously unreleased.

Reviewer Johnny Loftus of Allmusic remarks that "Sonically, it is a little more diverse, or at least there are a few left turns among all the quiet-loud dynamics this time around." He calls the album "Just as worthy as its Emo Diaries brethren yet filled with refreshing moments of instrumental or melodic experimentation, Vol. 7 is sure to please the Deep Elm faithful and is a good introductory calling card for many of its participants."

Track listing

References

External links 
 Me Against the World at Deep Elm Records.

2002 compilation albums
Indie rock compilation albums
Deep Elm Records compilation albums
Emo compilation albums